Lloyd Kanda Pandi (born December 10, 1999) is a Canadian professional basketball player for Darüşşafaka  of the Turkish Basketbol Süper Ligi (BSL).

College career 
In his debut for Carleton, Pandi had 18 points to help defeat Waterloo 110-54, leading all Carleton starters with 22 minutes played. In his debut season, Pandi started 17 games out of the season's 22 games, eventually becoming a national champion with the Ravens as well as being named the U Sports Rookie of the Year. At the close of the season, Pandi was the Ravens' scoring leader, having played 19 of the 22 regular season games, as well as Canada's leading university player in field goal percentage.

In the summer following his debut season, Pandi was selected as one of the 21 university players invited to participate in the Canadian Elite Basketball League (CEBL) inaugural season, playing for the Ottawa Blackjacks. At the close of the summer season, Pandi was named the league's CEBL U Sports Player of the Year. The following year, the U Sports season was suspended due to the COVID-19 pandemic. However, Pandi was once again selected as one of the 21 university players participating in the CEBL, this time playing for the Niagara River Lions. At the end of that season, he was once again named the CEBL U Sports Player of the Year.

On April 10, 2022, Lloyd Pandi announced via social media that he will no longer be playing for the Carleton Ravens and enter the 2022 NBA Draft. In his second and last season with the Ravens, Pandi won the national U Sports Championship a second time and received the national award for U Sports Player of the Year (Mike Moser Most Valuable Player Award).

Professional career
On December 12, 2022, he signed with Darüşşafaka  of the Turkish Basketbol Süper Ligi (BSL).

National team career 
On August 23, 2022, Pandi got his first call to the Canadian national team as part of the country's 2022 FIBA AmeriCup roster. He went on to average 5.7 points and 2.8 rebounds over an average of 19.1 minutes across 6 games. Canada finished 4th in the competition.

Career statistics

College

|-
| style="text-align:left;"| 2019–20
| style="text-align:left;"| Carleton
| 19 || 17 || 23.2 || .663 || .800 || .768 || 5.9 || 1.8 || 1.2 || 0.6 || 15.9

|-
| style="text-align:left;"| 2021–22
| style="text-align:left;"| Carleton
| 14 || 14 || 27.1 || .547 || .500 || .833 || 8.1 || 3.1 || 1.7 || 0.4 || 14.7

CEBL

|-
| style="text-align:left;"| 2020
| style="text-align:left;"| Ottawa
| 6 || 0 || 23.0 || .486 || – || .571 || 5.3 || 1.3 || 1.3 || 0.5 || 8.3
|-
| style="text-align:left;"| 2021
| style="text-align:left;"| Niagara
| 16 || 9 || 22.0 || .449 || .429 || .595 || 3.3 || 2.7 || 1.5 || 0.2 || 7.6

References 

1999 births
Living people
Canadian basketball players
Carleton Ravens basketball players
Carleton Ravens players
Darüşşafaka Basketbol players
Niagara River Lions players
Ottawa Blackjacks players
Point guards
Shooting guards
Small forwards